John Adams, also known as just Adams, is a giant sequoia located within the Giant Forest Grove of Sequoia National Park, California.  The tree was named after John Adams, the 2nd president of the United States. The tree is the thirteenth largest giant sequoia in the world.

Description
The trunk of Adams features a large triangular burn scar on its north face.

Dimensions

See also
List of largest giant sequoias
List of individual trees

References

Individual giant sequoia trees
Sequoia National Park